Dommartin-Lettrée is a village and commune in the Marne department in north-eastern France some 22 kilometres south of Châlons-en-Champagne and some 22 kilometres west of Vitry-le-François. The church is to be found in a central position in the village and the Commonwealth war graves of five airmen of the Royal Air Force and two of the Royal Canadian Air Force lie in the churchyard immediately behind the church.

The seven serviceman were killed when their Lancaster bomber (Lancaster III serial JB741 code: AR-J) was shot down near the village by enemy fire on May 4, 1944 before completing their mission.

See also
Communes of the Marne department
Commonwealth War Graves Commission

References

External links

Aircrew Remembrance Society

Dommartinlettree